A Small Family Business is a play by Alan Ayckbourn about the eponymous business and dealing with the Thatcherism of the time. It premiered at the Olivier stage of the Royal National Theatre on 20 May 1987, where it won the Evening Standard Award for Best Play for that year. Its Broadway premiere occurred on 27 April 1992.

Radio adaptation
A radio adaptation directed by Martin Jarvis was broadcast at 8 p.m. on Sunday 12 April 2009 on BBC Radio 3 as part of the celebrations of its author's 70th birthday that day. Its cast included:

 Jack McCraken – Alfred Molina
 Benedict – Adam Godley
 Poppy – Rosalind Ayres
 Anita – Joanne Whalley
 Cliff – Kenneth Danziger
 Ken – Roy Dotrice
 Yvonne – Millicent Martin
 Harriet – Jill Gascoine
 Desmond – Julian Sands
 Roy – Darren Richardson
 Tina – Moira Quirk
 Samantha – Fuchsia Sumner
 The five Rivetti brothers – Matthew Wolf

Reception
In 2000, The Telegraph's Charles Spencer praised A Small Family Business as one of the "finest British plays of recent years" along with Tom Stoppard's Arcadia (1993).

References

External links
Major productions of A Small Family Business
Radio 3 adaptation

1987 plays
Plays by Alan Ayckbourn